There have been two notable fires in Oakland, California:

 Oakland firestorm of 1991
 2016 Oakland warehouse fire